Pachycondyla is a ponerine genus of ants found in the Neotropics.

Distribution
Pachycondyla is currently distributed from southern United States to northern Argentina, but some fossil species (e.g. P. eocenica and P. lutzi) are found in Europe.

Species
The genus formerly contained hundreds of species, most of them belonging to at the time junior synonyms of Pachycondyla. While revising the ponerines, Schmidt & Shattuck (2014) revived many of the former synonyms, leaving only eleven species in Pachycondyla. They were not able to place some species with certainty, and left more than twenty species incertae sedis in Pachycondyla, acknowledging that "this placement is undoubtedly incorrect".

Pachycondyla constricticeps Mackay & Mackay, 2010
Pachycondyla crassinoda (Latreille, 1802)
Pachycondyla fuscoatra (Roger, 1861)
Pachycondyla harpax (Fabricius, 1804)
Pachycondyla impressa (Roger, 1861)
Pachycondyla inca Emery, 1901
Pachycondyla lattkei Mackay & Mackay, 2010
Pachycondyla lenis Kempf, 1961
Pachycondyla lenkoi Kempf, 1962
Pachycondyla purpurascens Forel, 1899
Pachycondyla striata Smith, F., 1858

incertae sedis

Pachycondyla curiosa Mackay & Mackay, 2010
Pachycondyla jonesii Forel, 1891
Pachycondyla solitaria Smith, F., 1860
Pachycondyla unicolor Smith, F., 1860
Pachycondyla vidua Smith, F., 1857
Pachycondyla vieirai Mackay & Mackay, 2010
†Pachycondyla aberrans Dlussky, Rasnitsyn, & Perfilieva, 2015
†Pachycondyla baltica Dlussky, 2002
†Pachycondyla calcarea (Théobald, 1937)
†Pachycondyla conservata Dlussky, 2009
†Pachycondyla crawleyi (Donisthorpe, 1920)
†Pachycondyla dubia (Théobald, 1937)
†Pachycondyla eocenica Dlussky & Wedmann, 2012
†Pachycondyla globiventris (Théobald, 1937)
†Pachycondyla gracilicornis (Mayr, 1868)
†Pachycondyla labandeirai (Dlussky & Rasnitsyn, 2002)
†Pachycondyla lutzi Dlussky & Wedmann, 2012
†Pachycondyla? messeliana Dlussky & Wedmann, 2012
†Pachycondyla minutansata (Zhang, 1989)
†Pachycondyla nubeculata (Zhang, 1989)
†Pachycondyla oligocenica Dlussky, Rasnitsyn, & Perfilieva, 2015
†Pachycondyla parvula Dlussky, Rasnitsyn, & Perfilieva, 2015
†Pachycondyla petiolosa Dlussky & Wedmann, 2012
†Pachycondyla petrosa Dlussky & Wedmann, 2012
†Pachycondyla succinea (Mayr, 1868)
†Pachycondyla tristis (Dlussky, 2009)

References

External links

Ponerinae
Ant genera
Hymenoptera of North America
Hymenoptera of South America
Taxa named by Frederick Smith (entomologist)